Allozelotes is a genus of East Asian ground spiders that was first described by C. M. Yin & X. J. Peng in 1998.

Species
 it contains four species, all found in China:
Allozelotes dianshi Yin & Peng, 1998 – China
Allozelotes lushan Yin & Peng, 1998 (type) – China
Allozelotes microsaccatus Yang, Zhang, Zhang & Kim, 2009 – China
Allozelotes songi Yang, Zhang, Zhang & Kim, 2009 – China

References

Araneomorphae genera
Gnaphosidae
Spiders of China